Broad Cove is a prominent cove in Yarmouth, Maine, United States. It sits between Sunset Point, at the southern end of Yarmouth, and the eastern edge of Cumberland Foreside. State Route 88 (formerly the Atlantic Highway) runs beside the cove (as Foreside Road south of the Yarmouth line and Lafayette Street beyond it).

History 
In 1643, Englishman George Felt, who came to what was then North Yarmouth, Massachusetts Bay Colony, from Charlestown, Boston, eleven years earlier, purchased  in Broad Cove from Welshman John Phillips.

Later in the 17th century, Walter Gendall's farm incorporated the western end of the cove, at Duck Cove.

References

Coves of the United States
Bays of Maine
Landforms of Yarmouth, Maine